Cops and Robbers is a 1997 Russian crime comedy-drama film directed by Nikolay Dostal.

Plot 
A crook sells false archaeological treasures to a foreigner, not even suspecting that he is the director of a Russian-American pasta factory, who, realizing that he was deceived, ordered his guard to find a crook.

Cast 
 Sergey Batalov
 Yevgeniya Glushenko
 Gennady Khazanov
 Gennadiy Nazarov
 Vyacheslav Nevinny
 Tagir Rakhimov
 Elena Tsyplakova	
 Vladimir Zeldin

References

External links 
 

1997 films
1990s Russian-language films
Russian crime comedy-drama films
Russian detective films